Marcus Peducaeus Stloga Priscinus was a Roman senator active during the middle of the second century AD. He was ordinary consul for 141 as the colleague of Titus Hoenius Severus. An inscription from the Great Theatre at Ephesus mentions a Marcus Peducaeus Priscinus as proconsular governor of Asia in 155/156, whom professor Géza Alföldy, amongst others, has identified as this Priscinus. Priscinus is known only through surviving inscriptions.

Priscinus came of a Republican family, the Peducaei. His father was Marcus Peducaeus Priscinus, ordinary consul in 110. It has often been suggested that Priscinus adopted Marcus Peducaeus Plautius Quintillus, ordinary consul in 177; Quintillus was the birth son of Plautius Quintillus, consul in 159. The details of Priscinus' senatorial career have not yet been recovered.

References 

2nd-century Romans
Imperial Roman consuls
Roman governors of Asia
Stloga Priscinus